Reinado Internacional del Café 2013, was held in Manizales, Colombia, on January 12, 2013. 23 beauty queens competed for the title. The winner was Ivanna Vale, from Venezuela.

Results

Placements

Special awards

Official exhibits

Crossovers

Contestants who previously competed or will compete at other beauty pageants:

Reina Hispanoamericana 2009
 - Melody Mir (2nd runner up)
's representative
Miss Intercontinental 2010
 - Alejandra Balderas
Miss Atlántico Internacional 2011
 - Alejandra Balderas
Miss Universe 2011
 - Anedie Azael
Miss Supranational 2012
 - Adriana Rivera
Miss International 2012
 - Melody Mir (3rd runner up)
 - Anedie Azael (Top 15)
Miss Intercontinental 2012
 - Indira Ferreira
Miss Earth 2012
 - Jen-Ling Lu
Miss World 2013
 - Larisa Leeuwe (Top 20)
Miss Coffee International 2012
 - Claudy Blandon (2nd runner up)
Miss International 2015
 - Jennifer Valle (1st runner up)
Miss Earth 2016
 - Katherine Espin (WINNER)

References

External links
 Instituto de Cultura y Turismo de Manizales
 Alcaldía de Manizales
 Feria de Manizales
 Miss Venezuela La Nueva Era MB

2013
2013 beauty pageants
2013 in Colombia
January 2013 events in South America